Albert Noble Rawson (27 November 1896 – 10 August 1949) was an English professional footballer who played as a forward in the Football League for Sheffield United, Birmingham and Barnsley.

Rawson was born in West Melton, which was then in the West Riding of Yorkshire. He made his Football League debut with Sheffield United. He joined Birmingham in February 1923, and scored in each of his first five games, making a significant contribution to the club's remaining in the First Division. In 1924 he returned to Yorkshire and signed for Barnsley.

He later worked as a foreign and colonial correspondent. He died in 1949 and was survived by his widow, Lorna.

References

1896 births
1949 deaths
People from Brampton Bierlow
English footballers
Association football forwards
Sheffield United F.C. players
Birmingham City F.C. players
Barnsley F.C. players
English Football League players
Sportspeople from Yorkshire
English journalists